Marymount School of New York is an American college preparatory, independent, Catholic day school for girls located on the Upper East Side of the Manhattan borough of New York City, New York. 

It was founded by Mother Marie Joseph Butler in 1926 as part of a network of schools directed by the Religious of the Sacred Heart of Mary. 

The school enrolls students in nursery through class XII.

History 

Founded by Mother Marie Joseph Butler in 1926, Marymount School is part of a network of schools directed by the Religious of the Sacred Heart of Mary (RSHM). 

The RSHM was established in 1849 in Béziers, France, by Père Gailhac and Mère St. Jean. They expanded their ministry to the United States in 1877.

Mother Butler purchased the Florence Vanderbilt estate at 1028 Fifth Avenue in 1926 and founded Marymount School of New York. The adjoining Pratt mansion at 1027 Fifth Avenue was acquired in 1936, and the school expanded to the Dunlevy Milbank property at 1026 in 1950.

The three turn-of-the-century Beaux-Arts buildings at Houses at 1026–1028 Fifth Avenue occupy approximately half the block between 83rd and 84th Streets on Fifth Avenue.

Facilities 
Marymount has locations at Fifth Avenue, 82nd Street, and 97th Street.

The Lower and Upper Schools are housed at 1026–1028 Fifth Avenue at 84th Street. These buildings were built in 1901 by architect C. P. H. Gilbert and the architectural firm Van Vleck & Goldsmith. The buildings were listed on the National Register of Historic Places in 1999 as the Houses at 1026–1028 Fifth Avenue; the listing included three contributing buildings. 1026 and 1027 were designed by Van Vleck & Goldsmith; 1028 was designed by Gilbert. Joseph Van Vleck (1876–1942) and Goldwin Goldsmith were architectural partners.

Since the 1980s, the school has expanded in size and in program. A gymnasium was built on the roof of the Fifth Avenue buildings in 1984, and in 1994, three science labs were created on the top floors of two of the buildings. 

In August 1999, Marymount purchased a townhouse at 2 East 82nd Street to serve as the home of the Middle School. The new site opened in 2002 and now houses Classes III through V.

In 2011, Marymount leased an additional building at 116 East 97th Street to house its  Upper Middle School (Classes VI–VIII).  The facility also has several science labs, a media-production lab, a gymnasium, an instrumental music room, a fitness room, and a dance studio.

There is a free shuttle bus that takes Marymount's students across these three campuses and to sporting events.

Academics 

Marymount is divided into four divisions by age group. The Lower School includes Nursery–Class II; the Lower Middle School includes Classes III–V; the Upper Middle School includes Classes VI–VIII; and the Upper School includes Classes IX–XII. In the Upper School, honors and AP courses are offered in all major academic disciplines.

Marymount places an emphasis on STEM. Digital fabrication labs have 3D scanners and printers, laser cutters, soldering irons, Arduino microcontrollers, sewing machines, and drills. Marymount has been recognized as an Apple Distinguished Program for the past four years. There is a 1:1+ student-technology ratio—each student in Kindergarten–Class V receives an iPad; each student in Classes VI–XII receives a MacBook Air. Classrooms are equipped with interactive boards and media displays.

The Metropolitan Museum of Art and Central Park, located directly across the street from the Fifth Avenue Campus, provide resources for the school's academic and extracurricular programs. Several studio art, humanities, and art history classes meet in the museum's Carroll Classroom.

The school also has a partnership with the Online School for Girls so students can participate in online courses such as iOS App Development and AP Psychology.

During the summer between junior and senior year, students complete an internship as one of their graduation requirements. Students have interned at hospitals, film companies, district attorneys' offices, nonprofits, and financial firms.

One hundred percent of Marymount seniors graduate and are accepted to prestigious four-year colleges both in the U.S. and abroad.

Extracurriculars

Marymount offers extracurriculars and athletics programs for students. Popular clubs include Campus Ministry, Marymount Players (acting ensemble), Marymount Singers (concert choir), the Marifia (yearbook), the Joritan (newspaper), and the literary magazine, Muse. There are also cultural affinity clubs, including PRISM, Black Girls Rock, La Mesa Española, Asian Cultures Club, CAMBIAS, Model UN, Mock Trial, Women in Our World (W.O.W.), and Amnesty International.

Marymount has a performing arts program beginning in the Lower School. The Lower Mid and Upper Mid put on full musical productions in the spring and fall, respectively. In the Upper School, the Marymount Players perform a play in the fall and a musical in the spring, and the Drama Club puts on a student talent showcase for the whole school called the Arts Assembly. The Upper School's Marymount Singers have sung at CitiField and the Vatican. There is also a handbell choir, an instrumental ensemble for Upper Middle and Upper School students, and a "School of Rock" band.

The school also offers athletic programs. Intramural play begins in Class III, and interscholastic competition starts in Class V. Sports include: badminton,  basketball, cross country, fencing, lacrosse, rowing, soccer, softball, swimming, tennis, track & field, and volleyball. Many of these sports include both junior varsity and varsity teams. 

Marymount athletic teams routinely practice and compete in New York locations such as Central Park and Randall's Island.

Membership and accreditation

Marymount is chartered by the Board of Regents of the University of the State of New York and accredited by the New York State Association of Independent Schools.

The school holds memberships in the National Association of Independent Schools, the Educational Records Bureau, the Independent School Admissions Association of Greater New York, the National Catholic Educational Association, and the National Coalition of Girls' Schools.

Notable alumnae

 Stella Araneta – beauty queen
 Pelin Batu – author and actress
 Cher Calvin – presenter
 Marta Casals Istomin – musician
 Margarita Forés – chef
 Julianne Michelle – actress
 Alicia Nash – physicist
 Maria Teresa – Grand Duchess of Luxembourg
 Natalie Trundy – actress

Notable faculty

 Nicole Ross (born 1989) – Olympic foil fencer

References

External links

School website
RSHM Network of Schools
Architectural essay on buildings at 84th and Fifth Avenue.

Girls' schools in New York City
Roman Catholic secondary schools in Manhattan
Educational institutions established in 1926
Private high schools in Manhattan
1926 establishments in New York City
Buildings and structures on the National Register of Historic Places in New York City
Beaux-Arts architecture in New York City
School buildings on the National Register of Historic Places in Manhattan